This is a list of Batman children's books, picture books published in the United States, beginning in the year 2008.

Book series introduced in 2008
American picture books
Children's Books
Children's Books
Lists of children's books